Deering is an unincorporated community in Pemiscot County, Missouri, United States. It is located fifteen miles west of Caruthersville.

Deering began as a lumber town in the early 1900s. The post office has been in operation since 1903. The community was named for William Deering, founder of the Deering Harvester Company, which in 1902 merged into the newly formed International Harvester Company. The company owned the land on which the community was established, and the land was later acquired by the Wisconsin Lumber Company.

The area is served by Delta C-7 schools district, which houses grades K–12.

Demographics

References

Unincorporated communities in Pemiscot County, Missouri
Unincorporated communities in Missouri
Company towns in Missouri
Navistar International